Thomas Hardiman (born 2 July 1964) is a South African cricketer. He played in seven first-class matches for Border in 1985/86 and 1986/87.

See also
 List of Border representative cricketers

References

External links
 

1964 births
Living people
South African cricketers
Border cricketers
People from Bethlehem, Free State